Galid Osman Didi Jr. (born February 18, 1986, in São Paulo) is a Brazilian auto racing driver. He is better known as Galid Osman.

In 2010 and 2011 he raced at the Copa Chevrolet Montana, finishing 8th and 4th respectively. Since then he drives in the Brazilian V8 Stock Car Series, where he finished 16th in the 2012 overall standings, 19th in 2013 and 17th in 2014. Also, he has raced at the Brasileiro de Marcas, where ended 10th in 2011 and 20th in 2012 with Chevrolet, and 8th in 2013 and 2014 with Toyota.

Racing record

Career summary

References

External links
 

1986 births
Living people
Racing drivers from São Paulo
Brazilian racing drivers
Formula 3 Sudamericana drivers
Stock Car Brasil drivers
TC 2000 Championship drivers
Súper TC 2000 drivers

Brazilian Formula Renault 2.0 drivers
Brazilian people of Lebanese descent
Hitech Grand Prix drivers